Mauro Esteban Navas Dellepiani (born 20 October 1974) is an Argentine retired footballer who played as a right back, and current youth coach at Boca Juniors.

His professional career was spent, other than in his country, where he played in various clubs and divisions, in Italy and Spain. In the latter nation, he played four years with Espanyol in La Liga.

Club career
Navas was born in Buenos Aires. After appearing prominently in his country for Club Atlético Banfield and Racing Club de Avellaneda, he signed with Italian club Udinese Calcio, only missing one game as it finished seventh and qualified for the UEFA Cup.

During the next four seasons he played in Spain with RCD Espanyol, starting in his first year – which ended with the conquest of the Copa del Rey – and appearing regularly for the Barcelona-based side in the following campaigns. After a sole season in the same country with lowly CD Leganés, he returned to his homeland in 2004, continuing to play mainly in the lower leagues (he had a brief spell in the Primera División, with modest Club Almagro).

Coaching career
In November 2008, Navas was appointed assistant coach of Ricardo Zielinski at Chacarita Juniors. He left the position in July 2009.

On 22 March 2010 Navas was appointed manager of Chacarita Juniors who had just dismissed Fernando Gamboa, fired after the 0–2 away defeat against Club Atlético Huracán. However, he lasted less than one month at the helm of the team, leaving on 19 April. At the end of December 2010, Navas was appointed manager of Platense. He was in charge for 11 games, before his contract was terminated by mutual consent.

In 2012, Navas was hired as a youth coach at his former club Boca Juniors.

At the end of August 2014, Navas returned to Boca Juniors as an assistant coach under manager Rodolfo Arruabarrena. In June 2016, Navas followed Arruabarrena to Al Wasl, once again functioning as his assistant.

On 11 June 2019, Navas was appointed manager of Fénix. After poor results, Navas was released on 16 October 2019. In 2020, he returned to Boca Juniors as a youth coach.

References

External links
 Mauro Navas – Argentine League statistics at Fútbol XXI  
 
 Stats at Liga de Fútbol Profesional 
 

1974 births
Living people
Argentine people of Spanish descent
Footballers from Buenos Aires
Argentine footballers
Association football defenders
Argentine Primera División players
Club Atlético Banfield footballers
Racing Club de Avellaneda footballers
Club Almagro players
Serie A players
Udinese Calcio players
La Liga players
Segunda División players
RCD Espanyol footballers
CD Leganés players
Argentine expatriate footballers
Expatriate footballers in Italy
Expatriate footballers in Spain
Argentine expatriate sportspeople in Italy
Argentine expatriate sportspeople in Spain
Argentine expatriate sportspeople in Qatar
Argentine football managers
Chacarita Juniors managers
Club Atlético Platense managers